Dead Man's Folly is a 1986 British-American made-for-television mystery film featuring Agatha Christie's Belgian detective Hercule Poirot. It is based on Christie's 1956 novel Dead Man's Folly. The film was directed by Clive Donner and starred Peter Ustinov as Poirot.

The cast included Jean Stapleton, Tim Pigott-Smith, Jonathan Cecil, Constance Cummings and Nicollette Sheridan. It was shot largely on location at West Wycombe Park in Buckinghamshire, England.

Plot introduction
Hercule Poirot and his associate, Captain Hastings, are called in by his eccentric mystery author friend, Ariadne Oliver, to a manor house in Devon. Oliver is organizing a "Murder Hunt" game for a local fair to be held at Nass House, but she is troubled by something she cannot quite put her foot on.

Things take a turn for the worse when during the "Murder Hunt" the girl playing the "dead" body is murdered for real. Soon afterwards, the lady of the manor mysteriously disappears and an old man's body is pulled from the river. Poirot must discover who and what are behind these seemingly unconnected events.

Cast
 Peter Ustinov as Hercule Poirot
 Jean Stapleton as Ariadne Oliver
 Constance Cummings as Amy Folliat 
 Tim Pigott-Smith as Sir George Stubbs 
 Jonathan Cecil as Captain Arthur Hastings
 Kenneth Cranham as Detective Inspector Bland 
 Susan Wooldridge as Amanda Brewis
 Christopher Guard as Alec Legge
 Jeff Yagher as Eddie South
 Nicollette Sheridan as Hattie Stubbs (as Nicolette Sheridan) 
 Ralph Arliss as Michael Weyman
 Caroline Langrishe as Sally Legge
 Alan Parnaby as The Boatman

Sequels 
In 1974, Murder On The Orient-Express was released, starring Albert Finney as Hercule Poirot. As Finney was unable to reprise his role in 1978, for the sequel, Death On The Nile, Peter Ustinov was cast. He reprised the role for Evil Under The Sun in 1982 and later committed to several made-for-television-films. Apart from Dead Man's Folly, Murder In Three Acts and Thirteen At Dinner were released. Another screen adaption of one of Christie's novels in 1988, Appointment With Death, marked Ustinov's final portrayal of the Belgian detective.

References

External links

 
 
 

1986 television films
1986 films
1980s mystery films
British television films
British mystery films
American mystery films
1980s English-language films
Films based on Hercule Poirot books
Films set in Devon
CBS network films
Warner Bros. films
Fiction about child murder
Films directed by Clive Donner
1980s American films
1980s British films